Filippo Lancia (died 1564) was a Roman Catholic prelate who served as Bishop of Lipari (1554–1564).

Biography
On 13 April 1554, Filippo Lancia was appointed during the papacy of Pope Julius III as Bishop of Lipari.
He served as Bishop of Lipari until his death in 1564.

References

External links and additional sources
 (for Chronology of Bishops) 
 (for Chronology of Bishops) 

16th-century Italian Roman Catholic bishops
Bishops appointed by Pope Julius III
1564 deaths